Eric M. Thorson was the Inspector General for the United States Treasury Department.

Career
 Thorson is a graduate of the United States Air Force Academy.
 He served in the Department of the Air Force as Acting Assistant Secretary and twice as Deputy Assistant Secretary.
 Special Assistant to the Senate Republican Leader, Chief Investigator for the Senate Finance Committee and Chief Investigator for the Senate Permanent Subcommittee on Investigations.
 Office of Personnel Management (worked as a senior advisor to the Director for Investigative Operations and Agency Planning)
 Inspector General for the Small Business Administration.

Inspector General of the Treasury 
Thorson was nominated to be Inspector General of the Department of the Treasury by President George W. Bush on November 15, 2007, and confirmed by the United States Senate on August 1, 2008. He was sworn into office on August 12, 2008. He retired in June 2019 and was replaced by Acting Inspector General Richard K. Delmar.

References

External links
 US Treasury bio

Living people
Troubled Asset Relief Program
United States Air Force Academy alumni
Year of birth missing (living people)